Trà Vinh is a province in the Mekong Delta region of Vietnam. The capital is Trà Vinh City.

Administrative divisions
Trà Vinh is subdivided into nine district-level sub-divisions:

 7 districts:

 Càng Long
 Cầu Kè
 Cầu Ngang
 Châu Thành
 Duyên Hải
 Tiểu Cần
 Trà Cú

 1 district-level town:
 Duyên Hải
 1 provincial city:
 Trà Vinh (capital)

They are further subdivided into 11 commune-level towns (or townlets), 85 communes, and nine wards.

Demographics
Besides having mostly Vietnamese, Trà Vinh is populated with many members of the Khmer Krom ethnic group. Trà Vinh also has one of the largest ethnic Hoa (Chinese) communities in Vietnam.

References

External links 
  of the Trà Vinh province government

 
States and territories established in 1992
Provinces of Vietnam